The 2010–11 season was the 114th season of competitive football by Heart of Midlothian, and their 28th consecutive season in the top level of Scottish football, competing in the Scottish Premier League. Hearts also competed in the Scottish Cup & the Scottish League Cup.

Overview
Hearts first four SPL games of the 2010–11 season were announced as St Johnstone at home, Hamilton away, Dundee Utd at home, and Celtic away.

Heart of Midlothian have made 6 signings over the summer break: Stephen Elliott, Kevin Kyle, Darren Barr, Marian Kello, as a permanent deal, after being on loan at the club, Adrian Mrowiec from FBK Kaunas and Rudolf Skácel returned to the club.

Hearts started the league off with a 1–1 draw with St Johnstone, a 0–4 win over Hamilton, and a 1–1 draw with Dundee United. Performances have received positive reviews so far, and Hearts have been unlucky not to win all 3 of their opening games, taking the lead in each.

Hearts have had 6 consecutive wins in a row beating rivals Hibernian 2–0 at Easter Road Stadium, while beating Celtic, Hamilton and Saint Johnstone 2–0 as well, they hammered Aberdeen 5–0 at Tyncastle and beat Motherwell 2–1 away from home.

On 3 February 2011 it was announced that Andy Webster would return to the club after being released by Rangers of deadline day of the transfer window. He signed a two and a half year deal.

Hearts Drew 5 then lost the last 3 games of the season against Rangers, Celtic and Dundee United narrowly scraping third place by 2 points. despite being 16 points clear at one point in the season.

Matches

Pre-Season Friendlies

Scottish Premier League

Hearts began their SPL campaign at home to St Johnstone.

Scottish Cup

Hearts entered the Scottish Cup in the fourth round and were given a tough game by SPL side St Johnstone narrowly being defeated 0–1 at home in the dying minutes of the game.

Scottish League Cup

Hearts entered the Scottish League Cup in the second round being handed a home tie against Scottish Third Division side Elgin City. Hearts won the game emphatically 4–0. Hearts then traveled to Scottish First Division side Falkirk. The game was a dramatic affair Hearts going in 2–0 down at half time with only ten men left after Craig Thomson was sent off. Hearts fought back and went 3–2 ahead through a penalty and goal from Kevin Kyle and Suso Santana only to be disappointed again when with Hearts tiring falkirk equalised to make it 3–3 in the 80th minute. Hearts tried to defend hard hoping to push the game to extra time only to be defeated in the last minutes of injury time. Falkirk knocking them out 4–3.

League table

Players

Squad information

{| class="wikitable sortable"
|-
! Squad Number !! Player Name !! Position !! Appearances || Goals
|-
|1 ||  János Balogh || GK ||1 || 0
|-
| 2   || | Dawid Kucharski   || DF  ||0 || 0
|-
| 3   ||  | Lee Wallace|| DF  || 10|| 0
|-
| 4 || | Eggert Jónsson || DF  || 32 || 1
|-
| 5 || | Darren Barr || DF ||14 || 0
|-
| 6 || | Rubén Palazuelos || MF ||36 || 0
|-
| 7 || | Suso Santana || MF || 21|| 1
|-
| 8 || | Ian Black || MF ||34 || 1
|-
| 9 || | Kevin Kyle || FW || 22|| 10
|-
| 10 || | Stephen Elliott || FW || 31 || 8
|-
| 11 || | Andrew Driver || MF || 14|| 0
|-
| 12 || | David Templeton ||MF  ||36 || 7
|-
|13 ||  | David Obua|| MF ||14 || 0
|-
| 14|| | Callum Elliot || FW || 21|| 4
|-
|15||  | Andy Webster  ||DF  ||9 || 0
|-
| 16 ||  Ryan Stevenson || MF ||34 || 7
|-
| 17 ||  Ryan McGowan ||DF  ||8 || 0
|-
|  18 || | Arvydas Novikovas || MF || 8|| 2
|-
|19 ||  | Rudi Skácel || MF || 29|| 13
|-
| 20 || | Jason Thomson || DF ||6 || 0
|-
| 21||  | Ismaël Bouzid  || DF || 35|| 0
|-
| 23 || | Gary Glen || FW ||11 || 0
|-
| 24 ||  | Craig Thomson || DF ||29 ||1
|-
| 25 || | Marián Kello  || GK  || 32|| 0
|-
| 26 || | Marius Žaliūkas ||DF ||29 || 1
|-
| 27 || | Scott Robinson || FW ||5 ||1 
|-
| 28 || | Mark Ridgers || GK ||0 || 0
|-
| 30 || | Jamie MacDonald || GK ||8 || 0
|-
| 31  || | Adrian Mrowiec || MF ||33 || 0
|-
| 34  || | Jonny Stewart || MF ||0 || 0
|-
| 42  || | Robert Ogleby || FW ||0 || 0
|-
| 44  || | Denis Prychynenko || MF ||0 || 0
|-
| 47  || | Colin Hamilton || DF ||0 || 0
|-
| 51  || | Jason Holt || MF ||1 || 0
|-
| 52  || | David Smith || FW ||1 || 0
|-
|   ||| Jamie Mole ||FW  ||0 || 0
|-
| ||  | Evaldas Razulis  ||MF  ||0 || 0

Appearances (starts and substitute appearances) and goals include those in The SPL, Scottish Cup and League Cup.
1Player first came to the club on loan and was transferred the following year.
Squad only includes players currently registered with the club and those with professional contracts only.

Captains

Disciplinary records
{| class="wikitable sortable" style="text-align:left; font-size:95%;"
|- style="background:#d3d3d3;"
! class="sortable" style="width:50px;"|No.
! style="width:50px;"|Pos.
! class="sortable" style="width:50px;"|Nat.
! style="width:130px;"|Player
!  style="width:50px; background:#fe9;"| 
!  style="width:50px; background:#fe9;"|   
!  style="width:50px; background:#ff8888;"| 
|- 
| 1 || GK ||   || János Balogh || 0 || 0 || 0
|- style="background:#d3d3d3;"
| 2 || DF ||  | ||  Dawid Kucharski  || 0 || 0 || 0
|-
| 3 || DF || | || Lee Wallace || 3 || 0 || 0
|- style="background:#d3d3d3;"
| 4 || DF || | || Eggert Jónsson || 7 || 0 || 1*
|-
| 5 || DF || | ||  Darren Barr || 3 || 0 || 0
|- style="background:#d3d3d3;"
| 6 ||MF ||  || Rubén Palazuelos || 6 || 1 || 1
|-
| 7 || MF  ||  || Suso Santana || 5 || 0 || 0
|- style="background:#d3d3d3;"
| 8 || MF ||  || Ian Black || 12 || 0 || 0
|-
| 9 ||  FW ||  || Kevin Kyle  || 6 || 0 || 0
|- style="background:#d3d3d3;"
| 10 || FW ||  || Stephen Elliott || 2 || 0 || 0
|-
| 11 || MF ||  || Andrew Driver  || 1 || 0 || 0
|- style="background:#d3d3d3;"
| 12 || MF ||  || David Templeton || 5 || 0 || 0
|-
| 13 || MF ||  || David Obua || 1 || 0 || 1
|- style="background:#d3d3d3;"
| 15 || FW ||  || Callum Elliot|| 2 || 0 || 0
|-
| 15 || DF ||  || Andy Webster || 0 || 0 || 0
|- style="background:#d3d3d3;"
| 16 || MF ||  ||Ryan Stevenson|| 3 || 0 || 0
|-
| 17 || DF ||  ||  Ryan McGowan || 1 || 0 || 0
|- style="background:#d3d3d3;"
| 18 || MF ||  || Arvydas Novikovas || 0 || 0 || 0
|-
| 19 || MF ||  || Rudi Skácel || 5 || 0 || 0
|- style="background:#d3d3d3;"
| 20 || DF ||  || Jason Thomson  || 3 || 0 || 0
|-
| 21 || DF ||  || Ismaël Bouzid || 7 || 0 || 0
|- style="background:#d3d3d3;"
| 23 || FW ||  ||  Gary Glen || 0 || 0 || 0
|- style="background:#d3d3d3;"
| 24 || DF ||  || Craig Thomson|| 5 || 0 || 1
|- style="background:#d3d3d3;"
| 25 || GK ||  ||  Marián Kello || 0 || 0 || 0
|- style="background:#d3d3d3;"
| 26 || DF ||  ||  Marius Žaliūkas || 5 || 0 || 1
|- style="background:#d3d3d3;"
| 27 || FW ||  || Scott Robinson  || 0 || 0 || 0
|- style="background:#d3d3d3;"
| 28 || GK ||  ||  Mark Ridgers || 0 || 0 || 0
|- style="background:#d3d3d3;"
| 30 || GK ||  ||   Jamie MacDonald || 0 || 0 || 0
|- style="background:#d3d3d3;"
| 31 || MF ||  ||  Adrian Mrowiec  || 5 || 0 || 0
|- style="background:#d3d3d3;"
| 34 || MF ||  ||  Jonny Stewart  || 0 || 0 || 0
|- style="background:#d3d3d3;"
| 42 || FW ||  ||  Robert Ogleby  || 0 || 0 || 0
|- style="background:#d3d3d3;"
| 44 || MF ||  ||  Denys Prychynenko  || 0 || 0 || 0
|- style="background:#d3d3d3;"
| 47 || DF  ||  ||  Colin Hamilton  || 0 || 0 || 0
|- style="background:#d3d3d3;"
| 51 || MF ||  ||   Jason Holt  || 0 || 0 || 0
|- style="background:#d3d3d3;"
| 52 || FW ||  ||  David Smith  || 0 || 0 || 0
|- style="background:#d3d3d3;"
|  || FW ||  ||  Jamie Mole  || 0 || 0 || 0
|- style="background:#d3d3d3;"
|  ||FW ||  ||  Evaldas Razulis   || 0 || 0 || 0

Red Card was rescinded after appeal.

Top scorers

Hearts Personnel Awards

Transfers

In

Out

Loans

In

Out

See also
List of Heart of Midlothian F.C. seasons

External links
 Hearts FC Official Website – First Team Fixtures and Results 2010–11
 Edinburgh Evening News – Heart of Midlothian FC

Heart of Midlothian F.C. seasons
Heart of Midlothian